The 1972 Segunda División de Chile was the 21st season of the Segunda División de Chile.

Palestino was the tournament's champion.

Table

See also
Chilean football league system

References

External links
 RSSSF 1972

Segunda División de Chile (1952–1995) seasons
Primera B
Chil